The following is a timeline of the history of the city of Dubai, United Arab Emirates.

Prior to 20th century

 1787 – Al Fahidi Fort built (approximate date).
 1833
 Dubai taken by "Al bu Falasah clansmen of the Bani Yas," becoming independent of Abu Dhabi Emirate.
 Obaid bin Saeed bin Rashid and Maktoum bin Butti bin Suhail are its first (joint) rulers.
 1836 Obaid bin Saeed dies. Maktoum bin Butti becomes sole ruler.
 1852 – Saeed bin Shakhbut Al Maktoum becomes ruler of Dubai.
 1859 – Hasher bin Maktoum becomes ruler of Dubai.
 1865 – Indian Banians begin to arrive in Dubai.
 1886 – Rashid bin Maktoum becomes ruler of Dubai.
 1892 – Rulers of Trucial Oman sign exclusive treaty of protection with United Kingdom.
 1894 – Maktoum bin Hasher Al Maktoum becomes ruler of Dubai.
 1896 – Saeed Al Maktoum's House built.

In 20th century 

 1903-1904
 Dubai becomes "the main port of the Trucial Coast."
 1904 – British-India Steam Navigation Company begins regular service to Dubai.
 1906 – Butti bin Suhail Al Maktoum becomes ruler of Dubai.
 1910 - The British bombard Dubai with high explosive munitions - the Hyacinth Incident.
 1912 
 Al Ahmadiya School established
 Saeed bin Maktoum bin Hasher Al Maktoum becomes ruler of Dubai.
 1929
 Collapse of the pearling industry.
 1934 – British air base established.
 1938 – 'Majlis' economic/political "reform movement" occurs.
 1939 – Majlis al Tujjar (merchant committee) established.
 1941 – Dubai Post Office opened.
 1946 – October: Imperial Bank of Persia (to become British Bank of the Middle East, then HSBC) opened in Dubai.
 1948 – Abu Dhabi-Dubai border dispute.
 1949
 15 July: Mohammed bin Rashid Al Maktoum, current ruler of Dubai, born in Shindaga.
 1950 – "Petroleum exploration" begins in Dubai area.
 1952 – Iranian consulate established.
 1953 – National Front (anti-British political group) formed.
 1956
 Jashanmal shop in business.
 1 June: Dubai Police Force founded in Naif Fort.
 1957 – Dubai Municipality established.
 1958
 9 September: Rashid bin Saeed Al Maktoum becomes ruler of Dubai when his father Sheikh Saeed dies.
 1959
 Dubai Creek dredged.
 Dubai Airport opens.
 DNATA (Dubai National Air Travel Agency) established.
 1961 – 7 April: The MV Dara explodes and sinks off the shore of Dubai, killing 238 people.
 1962 – Population: 55,000 (estimate).
 1963
 23 May: Al Maktoum Bridge opens.
 1965
 15 May: Asphalt runway opens at Dubai International Airport.
 1966 – Fateh Oil Field discovered offshore in vicinity of Dubai.
 1967 – Dubai Zoo opens.
 1968
 18 February: Sheikh Zayed and Sheikh Rashid agree to Union at Argoub El Sedirah.
 1969 – Dubai TV begins broadcasting.
 1971
 10 July: The Trucial States Council of rulers agrees on Union.
 2 December: Six Trucial States, including Dubai, form the United Arab Emirates.
 Dubai Country Club and Dubai Museum established.
 1972
 January: A coup in neighbouring Sharjah kills ruler Sheikh Khaled and is put down by Sheikh Mohammed bin Rashid.
 February: Ras Al Khaimah joins the UAE.
 5 October: Port Rashid is inaugurated.
 1973
 Dubai drops Qatari Riyal and adopts use of Dirham currency.
 1975
 Al Shindagha Tunnel and Safa Park open.
 Dubai Islamic Bank established.
 5 May: Sheikh Rashid decrees establishment of Dubai Aluminium – Dubal.
 Arabtec Construction in business.
 1976 – Al Garhoud Bridge opens.
 1977 – Dubai 33 television begins broadcasting.
 1978
 16 April: English-language Khaleej Times newspaper begins publication.
 September: Rival Gulf News begins publication.
 Dubai World Trade Centre built.
 Oil production at Falah oil field begins.
 1979
 26 February: Queen Elizabeth II inaugurates Dubai Desalination Plant.
 Sheikh Mohammed marries Sheikha Hind.
 Oil production at Rashid oil field begins.
 Dubal Aluminium Company commences production.
 Dubai International Convention Centre built.
 Port of Jebel Ali inaugurated.
 Gulf News begins publication.
 1980
 Dubai Municipal Council created; Hamdan bin Rashid Al Maktoum becomes chairman.
 E 11 road (Abu Dhabi-Dubai) completed.
 Al Bayan newspaper begins publication.
 Population: 265,702.
 1983
 17 May: Sheikha Latifa, the wife of ruler Sheikh Rashid, dies.
 Dubai Drydocks open.
 20 December: Dubai Duty Free opens.
 1984
 Oil production at onshore field Margham begins.
 Ruler Sheikh Rashid develops health problems; power shifts to his sons.
 1985
 9 January: Decree establishing Jebel Ali Free Zone issued.
 March: Emirates Airline established.
 25 October: Emirates makes inaugural flight to Karachi.
 Dubai Medical College and UAE Contractors' Association established.
 1989
 Dubai Desert Classic golf contest begins.
 29 January: First Dubai Airshow inaugurated.
 Majlis Gallery opens.
 1990
 7 October: Dubai's ruler, Sheikh Rashid, dies.
 8 October: Maktoum bin Rashid Al Maktoum becomes ruler of Dubai and Prime Minister of the UAE.
 1991
 Juma al Majid Centre for Culture and Heritage established.
 Dubai Creek Golf & Yacht Club opens.
 May: Dubai Ports Authority formed in merger of JAFZA and Port Rashid authorities.
 1992
 Majid Al Futtaim Group headquartered in Dubai.
 24 December: Godolphin's first horse Cutwater runs, – and wins – at Nad Al Sheba.
 1995
 3 January: Sheikh Mohammed bin Rashid named crown prince of Dubai.
 American University in Dubai established.
 1996
 16 February: Dubai Shopping Festival launched.
 27 March: Dubai World Cup horse race − the world's richest − begins. Its first winner is American dirt track legend Cigar.
 1997
 World's first camel-llama cross-breeding accomplished.
 Chicago Beach Hotel demolished.
 Jumeirah (hotel chain) headquartered in Dubai.
 1998 – Grand Mosque rebuilt.
 Zayed University founded.
 1999
 Dubai Press Club formed.
 International Center for Biosaline Agriculture headquartered in Dubai.
 December: Burj Al Arab hotel inaugurated.
 Emirates National Oil Company refinery begins operating.
 29 October: Dubai Internet City announced.
 Dubai's real estate market is opened to non-GCC nationals for the first time.

21st century

2000s

 2000
 26 March: Dubai Financial Market founded.
 28 May: American University of Dubai inaugurated.
 Dubai Airport new terminal built.
 Nakheel Properties headquartered in Dubai.
 Al Barsha area development and Dubai Marathon begin.
 Dubai Internet City opens.
 4 November: Dubai Media City inaugurated.
 2001
 15 January: e-junior begins broadcasting.
 1 May: Artificial archipelagos the Palm Jumeirah and Palm Jebel Ali announced.
 June: Construction begins on Palm Jumeirah.
 2002
 9 January: Dubai Desert Conservation Reserve and eco-resort Al Maha founded.
 9 February: Million square feed academic free zone Dubai Knowledge Village announced.
 16 February: Dubai International Financial Centre inaugurated.
 6 November: $1.8 billion Dubai Healthcare City free economic zone announced
 Artificial archipelago Palm Jebel Ali construction begins.
 Population: 1,089,000.
 The Dubai Multi Commodities Center is established.
 2003
 September: International Monetary Fund meets in Dubai.
 Al Arabiya television and CNBC Arabiya television begin broadcasting.
 Executive Council of Dubai and Dubai Media Incorporated established.
 Dubai Knowledge Village opens.
 First Dubai Tennis Championships.
 June: International Media Production Zone (IMPZ) launched.
 5 May: The World (archipelago) project announced.
 Dubai Festival City construction begins.
 12 May: Dubai Maritime City project announced.
 16 June: Emirates places $19 billion biggest order in aviation history for 71 wide-bodied planes.
 Dubai Humanitarian City established. (Later to become International Humanitarian City)
 7days newspaper begins publication.
 2004
 Dubai Autodrome opens.
 Dubai One television begins broadcasting.
 Dubai Silicon Oasis is inaugurated.
 Planned second airport to be located in Jebel Ali confirmed.
 September: Foundation stone of world's tallest tower, Burj Khalifa, laid.
 October: Dubai Holding investment company established.
 December: Dubai International Film Festival inaugurated
 December Business Bay development project announced.
 December: Dubai School of Government launched (To become Mohammed bin Rashid School of Government).
 2005
 27 January: Dubai holds its first FEI World Endurance Riding Championship, Dubai International Endurance City opens.
 7 March: Permanent Committee for Labour Affairs established.
 Emirates Today newspaper begins publication.
 RAK Petroleum headquartered in Dubai.
 Mall of the Emirates (with Ski Dubai) opens.
 Dubai RTA (Roads and Transport Authority) formed.
 Dubai Gold & Commodities Exchange inaugurated.
 DP World founded from merger of Dubai Ports Authority and Dubai Ports International
 September: Construction labor strike.
 October: Dubai police introduces hotline for workers to report labour issues.
 November: $8 billion Jebel Ali Airport City project renamed Dubai World Central.
 2006
 January: Maktoum bin Rashid Al Maktoum dies in Australia's Gold Coast.
 January: Mohammed bin Rashid Al Maktoum becomes ruler of Dubai and Vice President of the UAE.
 February: Mohammed bin Rashid Al Maktoum becomes Prime Minister of the UAE.
 February: $15 billion Dubai Aerospace Enterprise launched.
 February: Dubai International Academic City development begins.
 March: Dubai port operator DP World acquires P&O for $7 billion.
 March: US house committee votes 62–2 to block DP World from operating US ports. DP World divests them.
 21 March: Construction labor demonstration.
 16 May: Construction labor strike.
 Emirates Green Building Council headquartered in Dubai.
 Dubai World investment company established.
 Population: 1,354,980.
 Dubai's education regulator, the Knowledge and Human Development Agency (KHDA) founded.
 December: Women only pink taxis go into service.
 2007
 February: New UAE telco 'Du' launches.
 June: Dubai's Salik (Meaning 'clear') road toll comes into effect.
 June: Dubai Real Estate Corporation founded.
 July: 'Temporary' crossing, the Floating Bridge opens.
 August: Real Estate regulator Real Estate Regulatory Agency (RERA) founded.
 Business Bay Crossing, originally named the Ras Al Khor Bridge, opens.
 Gulf Art Fair begins.
 Sheikh Mohammed announces the Dubai Strategic Plan 2015, a five-point long-term strategy for the city.
 Dubai World Cup prize money raised to $10 million.
 Dubai International City built.
 September: Dubai Cares charity founded. The initial fund-raising drive raises over Dhs1 billion.
 2008
 March: Dubai Culture & Arts Authority formed.
 March: New Maktoum Bridge opened.
 26 March: 2008 Dubai explosion in Al Quoz.
 March: New low-cost carrier Fly Dubai announced.
 Dubai Sports City opens.
 Tashkeel (art entity) established.
 Airport Dubai International Terminal 3 built.
 1,500 room Atlantis, The Palm hotel & resort launched with 1,000 fireworks.
 2009
 New Year celebrations and the opening celebration of the Dubai Shopping Festival cancelled in solidarity with Gaza.
 29 March: Chechen Yamadayev murdered in Dubai.
 Dubai Mall, the world's largest shopping mall, inaugurated.
 1 June: FlyDubai commences operations.
 September: Red Line (Dubai Metro) begins operating.
 Almas Tower built.
 Dubai International Cricket Stadium opens.
 Dubai World restructures.

2010s

 2010
 4 January: Burj Khalifa skyscraper opens (tallest in world).
 19 January: Palestinian Mahmoud Al-Mabhouh assassinated.
 28 January: Meydan Racecourse opens.
 4 February: New oilfield east of Rashid field announced, named Jalila.
 1 July: Al Maktoum International Airport begins operations.
 2011
 Green Line (Dubai Metro) begins operating Palm Deira station (Dubai Metro) opens.
 Salsali Private Museum founded.
 11 October: Emirates NBD takes over Dubai Bank.
 2012
 Princess Tower and JW Marriott Marquis Dubai built.
 21 March: Dubai Modern Art Museum & Opera House District projects announced.
 12 June: Dubai formally launches its bid for World Expo 2020.
 30 November: Restoration of 'Union House', where the UAE treaty was signed in 1971, commences.
 2013
 13 February: $1.5bn Bluewaters Island project announced, to include world's largest Ferris Wheel.
 4 March: Sheikh Mohammed establishes the Emirates Literature Foundation, to include the Dubai International Writers' Centre.
 Al Barsha Police Station built.
 The Mine (gallery) opens.
 October: Sheikh Mohammed announces the Dubai Water Canal.
 Population: 2,214,000.
 27 November: Dubai and the UAE win the bid for World Expo 2020.
 2014
 February: Dubai launches $1mn 'Drones for Good' award.
 5 July: World's largest mall and indoor theme park, the 48 million square foot Mall of the World project announced.
 16 July: The establishment of the UAE Space Agency and the launch of a Mars mission is announced.
 8 September: Dubai launches the Mohammed bin Rashid Centre for Government innovation.
 27 October: Dubai announces $1.2 billion investment in innovation through free zone operator TECOM.
 17 December: Dubai Plan 2021 development strategy is announced.
 Opera Grand, the first tower in the Dubai Opera House District, opens.
 2015
 Bicycle regulations issued.
 6 May: UAE Mars probe named Hope.
2016
3 August: Emirates Flight 521 crashes during landing at Dubai-International Airport. In the ensuing blaze, 1 firefighter is killed. Everyone on board the Boeing 777-300 survives.
November: Sheikh Mohammed inaugurates the Dubai Water Canal.
2017
1 May: Dubai Font, Dubai's own font, was launched.
21 Nov: Dubai Safari Park opened to public.
2018
1 Jan: Dubai Frame, World's best new attraction opening in 2018

See also
 History of Dubai
 List of rulers of the emirate of Dubai
 List of universities and colleges in Dubai
 List of schools in Dubai
 List of companies of Dubai
 List of shopping malls in Dubai
 List of hospitals in Dubai
 List of tallest residential buildings in Dubai
 Timelines of other cities in United Arab Emirates: Abu Dhabi
 Years in the United Arab Emirates

References

Bibliography

Published in 20th century
 
 
 Richard Trench (ed.), Arab Gulf Cities: Doha, Abu Dhabi, Dubai, Sharjah (Archives Editions, 1994)

Published in 21st century
2000s
 Sampler and Eigner. From Sand to Silicon. 2003.
 
 
 
 
 
 
 
 

2010s

External links

 Aerial view of Dubai, 1969 (moving image)
 Map of Dubai, 1986

 
Dubai
United Arab Emirates history-related lists